Uqba ibn Amr al-Ansari, also known by his kunya Abu Mas'ud al-Ansari was a companion of Muhammad. He was a prominent narrator of hadith, quoted in Sahih Bukhari, the most prominent source of Hadith among Sunni Muslims. He reportedly narrated 102 or more hadiths.

Life 
Uqba belonged to Medina and was among those who were present in the Pledge of al-Aqaba and promised that they would protect the Messenger of Allah at the cost of their lives. He took part in all battles with the Prophet and is said to have fought heroically. 

Uqba opposed the Kufan revolt against Uthman, the third caliph of the Rashidun Caliphate. Uthman's successor Ali appointed Uqba as the governor of Kufa. Afterward, Uqba married his daughter Umm Bashir to Ali's son Hasan. The modern historian Wilferd Madelung suggests that Ali was hoping to strength his relations with Uqba. Hasan and Umm Bashir had two (or possibly three) children with Umm Bashir, with their eldest son Zayd, his daughter Umm al-Husayn. It is also held that the couple had another daughter named Umm al-Hasan.

References

Bibliography 

 

Sahabah hadith narrators